List of heroes may refer to:
 List of Greek mythological figures
 Lists of superheroes
 List of Heroes characters